The Calvillo River is a river of Mexico. It is a tributary of the Juchipila River in the southern Sierra Madre Occidental.

See also
List of rivers of Mexico

References

Rivers of Mexico
Río Grande de Santiago
Rivers of the Sierra Madre Occidental